The ruined St. Mark's Church is a Cultural Monument of Albania, located in Vau i Dejës Castle, Vau i Dejës.

References

Cultural Monuments of Albania
Buildings and structures in Vau i Dejës